El Bola (English: Pellet) is a 2000 Spanish drama film, directed by Achero Mañas. It won the Goya Award for Best Film at the 15th Goya Awards. It is available in the United States from Filmmovement.

Plot 

Pablo a.k.a. "El Bola" is a twelve-year-old boy with an overly strict father. He has few friends at school until a new kid, Alfredo, arrives. The warm, caring atmosphere in Alfredo's family provides a stark contrast to Pablo's oppressive father. Pablo's experience of his friend's family teaches him to confront his worst fears.

Cast

References

External links

 
 

2000 films
2000 drama films
Best Film Goya Award winners
European Film Awards winners (films)
Madrid in fiction
Spain in fiction
2000s Spanish-language films
Films directed by Achero Mañas
Films about child abuse
Spanish drama films
2000s Spanish films